Monroe "Mance" Smith is an American former Negro league outfielder who played in the 1940s.

Smith played for the Kansas City Monarchs in 1944. In 23 recorded games, he posted 15 hits and eight RBI in 83 plate appearances.

References

External links
 and Seamheads

Year of birth missing
Place of birth missing
Kansas City Monarchs players
Baseball outfielders